The 2007 NCAA Division II women's basketball tournament was the 26th annual tournament hosted by the NCAA to determine the national champion of Division II women's  collegiate basketball in the United States.

Southern Connecticut defeated Florida Gulf Coast in the championship game, 61–45, to claim the Owls' first NCAA Division II national title.

The championship rounds were contested at the Health and Sports Center on the campus of the University of Nebraska at Kearney in Kearney, Nebraska.

Regionals

East - Glenville, West Virginia
Location: Jesse Lilly Gym Host: Glenville State University

South - Fort Myers, Florida
Location: Alico Arena Host: Florida Gulf Coast University

* – Denotes overtime period

North Central - Grand Forks, North Dakota
Location: Betty Engelstad Sioux Center Host: University of North Dakota

* – Denotes overtime period

Northeast - New Haven, Connecticut
Location: James W. Moore Fieldhouse Host: Southern Connecticut State University

South Atlantic - Morrow, Georgia
Location: Athletics Center Host: Clayton State University

* – Denotes overtime period

Great Lakes - Romeoville, Illinois
Location: Neil Corey Arena Host: Lewis University

South Central - St. Joseph, Missouri
Location: MWSU Fieldhouse Host: Missouri Western State University

West - La Jolla, California
Location: RIMAC Arena Host: University of California, San Diego

Elite Eight - Kearney, Nebraska
Location: Health and Sports Center Host: University of Nebraska at Kearney

All-tournament team
 Kate Lynch, Southern Connecticut
 LaShauna Jones, Southern Connecticut
 Shamika Jackson, Southern Connecticut
 Katie Schrader, Florida Gulf Coast
 Steffi Sorensen, Florida Gulf Coast

See also
 2007 NCAA Division I women's basketball tournament
 2007 NCAA Division III women's basketball tournament
 2007 NAIA Division I women's basketball tournament
 2007 NAIA Division II women's basketball tournament
 2007 NCAA Division II men's basketball tournament

References
 2007 NCAA Division II women's basketball tournament jonfmorse.com

 
NCAA Division II women's basketball tournament
2007 in Nebraska